Turpan Jiaohe Airport  is an airport serving the city of Turpan in Xinjiang Uyghur Autonomous Region, China. It is located 10 kilometers northwest of the city, and named after the Jiaohe Ruins. First built in the 1950s but out of use by the 1970s, the airport was relocated and rebuilt at the current site starting May 2009, with an investment of 430 million yuan. Turpan Airport was reopened on 9 July 2010.

Airlines and destinations

Ground transportation
The Turpan North Railway Station of the Lanzhou–Ürümqi High-Speed Railway, opened in November 2014, is located within 500 m from the airport.

See also
List of airports in China
List of the busiest airports in China

References

Airports in Xinjiang
Airports established in 2010
2010 establishments in China
Buildings and structures in Turpan